Philip David Kaltenbacher (born November 7, 1937) is the former Chairman and Chief Executive Officer of Seton Company and a former Chairman of the Port Authority of New York and New Jersey.

Biography 
Kaltenbacher was educated at the Newark Academy  He graduated Yale University in 1959, and received his law degree from Yale Law School in 1963.  He served in the U.S. Army in 1961. He was the president of the Seton Company, Inc., until it was acquired by GST AutoLeather in 2011.. Returning to New Jersey, he settled in Millburn and joined the Newark law firm of Hannoch Weisman. He also entered local Republican politics by assisting New Jersey General Assembly candidate Irwin I. Kimmelman, a lawyer with his firm. After Kimmelman was elected to the Assembly in 1963, Kaltenbacher served as Kimmelman's legislative aide.

He was elected to the state assembly in 1967, and was re-elected in 1969 and 1971. He ran on a ticket with Thomas Kean, who would later serve as Governor of New Jersey.  He dropped his bid for re-election to a fourth term after the June 1973 primary to devote more time to his business, and was replaced on the ticket with Jane Burgio.

After Kean won the Republican Gubernatorial Primary in 1981, he named Kaltenbacher to serve as the Chairman of the New Jersey Republican State Committee.  He held that post until 1984, when he became a Commissioner of the Port Authority of New York and New Jersey. His successor as state GOP chairman was Frank B. Holman.  He served at the Port Authority until 1990, when  Gov. James Florio took office.

|-

|-

|-

References 

1937 births
Living people
Chairmen of the New Jersey Republican State Committee
Newark Academy alumni
People from Millburn, New Jersey
Politicians from Essex County, New Jersey
Republican Party members of the New Jersey General Assembly
Yale Law School alumni
Chairmen of the Port Authority of New York and New Jersey